Revolution Square is a town square in the city of Maribor in Slovenia.

External links

Squares in Maribor